Felice Bauer (18 November 1887 – 15 October 1960) was a fiancée of Franz Kafka, whose letters to her were published as Letters to Felice.

Early life 

Felice Bauer was born in Neustadt in Upper Silesia (today Prudnik), into a Jewish family. Her father Carl Bauer (c. 1850–1914) was an insurance agent, her mother Anna, née Danziger (1849–1930) was the daughter of a local dyer. Felice had four siblings: Else (1883–1952), Ferdinand (called Ferri, 1884–1952), Erna (1885–1978) and Antonie (called Toni, 1892–1918). In 1899 the family moved to Berlin.

From 1909 on, she worked as a stenographer at the Berlin record company Odeon. One year later, she moved to the Carl Lindström Company, a manufacturer of gramophones and "Parlographs", then the most advanced dictation machines. After a short while she was promoted. She worked in marketing and represented the company at trade fairs. She contributed substantially to the income of her family.

Kafka 

Felice met Franz Kafka in Prague on 13 August 1912, when he visited his friend Max Brod and his wife. Brod's sister Sophie was married to a cousin of Felice's; Felice was in Prague on a trip to Budapest to visit her sister Else. A week after the meeting, on 20 August, Kafka entered in his diary:

Soon after the meeting he began to send her almost daily letters, expressing disappointment if she did not respond as frequently. He dedicated to her his short story "The Judgment" (also translated "The Verdict"), which he had written the night of 22 September 1912. They met again for Easter of 1913, and he proposed marriage in a letter at the end of July that year. The engagement took place on the Jewish holiday of Shavuot, Sunday 31 May 1914, in the presence of Kafka's parents and sister Ottla, but was broken a few weeks later, in August.

After difficult communication, again mostly in letters, and spending ten days together in Marienbad in July 1916, they met for a second engagement on 12 July 1917, planning to marry soon and live together in Prague. Suffering symptoms of the tuberculosis that was to lead to his death, Kafka broke the engagement again in December that year. She departed on 27 December.

She saved Kafka's more than 500 letters to her, which were published as Letters to Felice; her letters to him did not survive. Elias Canetti titled his book on the letters Kafka's Other Trial / The Letters to Felice, referring to Kafka's novel The Trial, which he describes as "a novel ... in which Kafka's engagement to Felice is re-imagined as the mysterious and menacing arrest of the hero". Michiko Kakutani notes in a review for The New York Times, "Kafka's Kafkaesque Love Letters" that Kafka's letters have:

Later life 

In 1919, she was married to Moritz Marasse (1873–1950), a partner in a private bank in Berlin. They had two children, Heinz (1920–2012) and Ursula (1921–1966). With the rise of the Nazis in the 1930 elections, the family moved to Switzerland, with financial loss. They settled there in 1931 and moved to the United States in 1936. She ran a store selling knitting ware made by her and her sister Else. Her husband died in 1950. In financial trouble due to an illness, she sold her letters from Kafka to the publisher Salman Schocken in 1955. She died in Rye, New York.

Legacy and cultural references
The musician Adam Green is her great-grandson.

In her solo play with music Felice to Franz (1992), performance artist Claudia Stevens portrays Felice as she responds to Kafka's letters.  The play's text recreates the letters Felice might have written to Franz.

In the 2011 BBC radio play Kafka the Musical, written by Murray Gold, the character Felice was played by Jessica Raine.

In the 2012 world premiere of the stage adaptation Kafka the Musical (written by Murray Gold and produced by Theatre Inconnu, in Victoria B.C.) the character Felice was played by Holly Jonson.

Literature 

 Elias Canetti: , Leipzig, Reclam 1985.
 Louis Begley: . , Munich 2008, p. 125
 Unda Hörner: Kafka und Felice. Roman. Berlin, ebersbach & simon 2017.

References

External links 

 

Franz Kafka
1887 births
1960 deaths
American people of German-Jewish descent
Silesian emigrants to the United States
Silesian Jews
People from Prudnik
People from the Province of Silesia
German emigrants to Switzerland